Evan Andrew Young (born September 14, 1976) is an American attorney and judge serving as an associate justice of the Supreme Court of Texas.

Education and career 

Young graduated from Tom C. Clark High School in San Antonio, and then earned a Bachelor of Arts in history from Duke University in 1999, where he graduated summa cum laude and was inducted into Phi Beta Kappa. He was also selected as a Marshall Scholar, and earned a Bachelor of Arts from Magdalen College, Oxford. He graduated from Yale Law School in 2004. Following law school, Young served as a law clerk to Judge J. Harvie Wilkinson III of the United States Court of Appeals for the Fourth Circuit and Associate Justice Antonin Scalia of the Supreme Court of the United States.

Young then served as counsel to the United States Attorney General during George W. Bush's second term, during which time he was detailed to Baghdad, Iraq as part of the U.S. Government’s Rule of Law mission. He later became a partner at Baker Botts, where he chaired the firm's Supreme Court and Constitutional Law practice group.

Young was a member of the Texas Judicial Council from 2017–2021. He has been an adjunct professor at the University of Texas School of Law and the University of Mississippi School of Law.

Judicial service 

Following Justice Eva Guzman's resignation, Governor Greg Abbott appointed Young to the Supreme Court of Texas on November 1, 2021. He took the oath of office on November 10, 2021, and will stand for election to a six-year term in 2022.

Personal life 

Young lives in Austin with his wife, Tobi Merritt Edwards Young, and their daughter. An enrolled citizen of the Chickasaw Nation, Tobi Young clerked for Justice Neil Gorsuch in 2018–19, and is believed to be the first member of a Native American tribe to serve as a U.S. Supreme Court law clerk.

See also 
 List of law clerks of the Supreme Court of the United States (Seat 9)

References 

1976 births
21st-century American lawyers
21st-century American judges
Duke University alumni
Federalist Society members
George W. Bush administration personnel
Justices of the Texas Supreme Court
Law clerks of the Supreme Court of the United States
Living people
Marshall Scholars
Place of birth missing (living people)
Texas lawyers
Texas Republicans
United States Department of Justice lawyers
Yale Law School alumni